The California Department was a department of the Second Mexican Empire (1863−1865) period of rule in post−colonial Mexico. 

The department included all the Baja California Peninsula. It did not include any of the former Alta California (present day California state), which was ceded to the U.S. in 1848.

The present day Mexican states of Baja California and Baja California Sur are located where the department was.

See also

References

Mexican Empire
Baja California Peninsula
Departments
History of Baja California
History of Baja California Sur
Subdivisions of Mexico
1863 establishments in Mexico
1865 disestablishments in Mexico